The 2006 United States Senate election in Utah was held November 7, 2006. Incumbent Republican Orrin Hatch won re-election to a sixth term.

Major candidates 
The filing deadline for major party candidates was March 17, 2006.

Democratic 
 Pete Ashdown, the founder and CEO of Utah's oldest Internet service provider, XMission.

Republican 
 Orrin Hatch, incumbent U.S. Senator first elected in 1976

Polling 
↔
X

Predictions

Results 

Hatch won all but one county with 60% to 70% of the vote. Ashdown won only Summit County by 342 votes.

See also 
 2006 United States Senate elections

References

External links 
 Pete Ashdown for United States Senate
 Scott Bradley for Senate
 The Official Orrin Hatch campaign site
 Joe Labonte's website
 Roger I. Price's website
 Libertarian Dave Starr Seely's website 
Utah
2006
2006 Utah elections